Richard Zajac (born 16 August 1976) is a Slovak football player.

External links
 

1976 births
Living people
Slovak footballers
FK Dubnica players
FK Dukla Banská Bystrica players
Podbeskidzie Bielsko-Biała players
Slovak Super Liga players
Slovak expatriate footballers
Slovak expatriate sportspeople in Poland
Expatriate footballers in Poland
Association football goalkeepers
Sportspeople from Žilina